The Vithoba Temple, officially known as Shri Vitthal-Rukmini Mandir, is a Hindu temple in Pandharpur, in the Indian state of Maharashtra. It is the main centre of worship for Vithoba, a form of the god Vishnu or Krishna, and his consort Rakhumai. The temple was built by King Vishnuvardhana of Hoysala Empire between 1108–1152 CE upon being convinced by the historical figure Pundalik. Also, there is an inscription in the temple, of a Hoysala King Vira Someshwara dating back to 1237 CE, which grants the temple a village for its upkeep. It is the most visited temple in Maharashtra. The Warkaris start marching from their homes to the temple of Pandharpur in groups called Dindi (procession) to reach on Aashadhi Ekadashi and Kartiki Ekadashi. A dip in the holy river Chandrabhaga, on whose banks Pandharpur resides, is believed to have power to wash all sins. All the devotees are allowed to touch the feet of the idol of Vithoba. In May 2014, the temple became the first in India to invite women and people from backward classes as priests.

Although parts of the temple date to the 12th or 13th century, the existing structure mainly dates to the 17th century or later, and reflects the later Deccan style, with dome motifs and lobed arches.

Legend of Pundalik

The saga of Pundalik is one of the most important Mahima legends about Vithoba. How Vithoba came to Pandharpur is a story in which Pundalik is vital. Pundalik is a devoted son to his parents Janudev and Satyavati, who lived in a forest called Dandirvan. But after his wedding, Pundalik begins ill-treating his parents. Tired with their son’s misbehavior and ill treatment, the elderly couple decide to leave for Kashi. Legend holds that people who die in the city of Kashi attain salvation and emancipation from the cycle of birth and death; so, many pious Hindus in the bygone era would relocate to Kashi as their end drew near.

However, the elderly couple are not destined to escape their suffering so easily. Upon hearing his parents' plans, Pundalik and his wife decide to join them on pilgrimage. The ill treatment continues. While the youthful son and his wife ride on horseback, the frail old couple walk in bad weather. Pundalik even makes his old parents work to make his own journey comfortable. Every evening, when the party camps for the night, the son forces his parents to groom the horses and do other jobs.

On the way to Kashi, the group reached the ashram (hermitage) of a pious and venerable sage, Kukkutswami. Exhausted, the family decides to spend a few days there. That night, when all were asleep, Pundalik by chance is awake and sees a remarkable vision. Just before dawn, a group of beautiful young women, dressed in soiled clothes, enter the ashram; they clean the floor, fetch water and wash the venerable sage’s clothes. After finishing their chores, they go to the prayer-room. When they reappear after prayer, their clothes are spotlessly clean. Then, they vanish as inexplicably as they had appeared.

Pundalik was not moved to raise an alarm, but feels a deep sense of peace witnessing the scene. It remains on his mind the whole day and he resolves to remain awake the next night, and confirm it was not merely a dream. This time, however, Pundalik is very curious. He approaches the beautiful women and asks details. They reply, they are the Ganga (Ganges), Yamuna and other holy rivers of India—revered for their holiness. Pilgrims wish to take a dip in their holy waters to wash away their sins, which in fact are soiling their clothes. Then, the women say: "But O Pundalik, you, with your ill-treatment of your parents, are the greatest sinner of them all!" Pundalik is utterly shocked and his consciousness transforms. He realizes his misdeeds, becomes entirely devoted to his parents and ensures their comfort, even risking his own.

Devotion in any form reaches God swiftly. Impressed by Pundalik's devotion to his parents, Krishna planned to bless Pundalik immediately. So, he left (His abode) for Pundalik’s ashram. Krishna knocks at Pundalik’s door, when he is busy serving his parents food. Pundalik does realize God is at his door. But such was his devotion to his parents, he wants to complete his duties and only then attend the visitor. Then, Pundalik does something strange but out of real devotion. He throws a brick outside for God to stand on and wait for him until he finishes attending to his parents. It is the first day of monsoon so it is wet and muddy outside.  If Lord Krishna stands upon a brick his feet will remain clean and dry.

Seeing this act, Krishna was extremely impressed and the ever-loving God waited for his devotee. When Pundalik came out, he begged for pardon but far from being displeased, Krishna was taken over by Pundalik's love for his parents and granted a boon. Pundalik requested Krishna to stay back on Earth and bless all his true devotees. He agreed to take the form of Vithoba, or God who stood upon a brick, and a temple came up there. Along with Vithoba, Rukmini (Mother Rukmini, the consort of Krishna) is also worshipped here.

Sant Namdeva Maharaj Payari

An interesting tale is that of the temple's first step called “Sant Namdev Maharaj Payari” (step of Sant Namdev Maharaj). The child and future saint, Namdev was an ardent devotee of Vithoba. One day his mother asks him to complete the ritual of “naivedya” (any food made in the house is first offered to God, the ritual comprises placing the offering plate before the deity and sprinkling water around the plate and with a prayer to God). Namdev faithfully does “naivedya” and waits for God to appear and take the offering. But he is disheartened. He keeps praying and requests God to come in person and accept the offering. With no answer, the child starts banging his head at the feet of God. Seeing this utmost devotion and innocence of a child, God appears, eats the offering and blesses Namdev. Namdev asks for being present in the "first step" at His temple, so that he could innumerable devotees will touch him before having the “darshan” (view). So, this first step is called “Sant Namdev Maharaj  Payari”. It is also believed that Tukaram, a 17th-century devotee of Krishna spent his last days in the temple.

Dindi Yatra

Ashadi Ekadasi is a religious procession and is celebrated during the months of June- July (Aashaadh Shukla paksha). It consists of a beautifully decorated Palkhi having the “padukas” of the lord and the Palkhi procession consists of people collectively walking, singing and dancing the glory of the Lord in what are called as ‘Dindis’. This is said to be the World's largest and oldest people movement where people gather on a specific day every year and perform a walk of a distance of around 250 km. Pandharpur Ashadi Ekadashi Wari journey has been honoured by World Book of Records, London under the title 'One of the Most visited places in a day'.

The Palkhi procession has remained unbroken since it began despite wars, famines and floods. More than Fifty Palkhis of saints assemble at Pandharpur every year. In Maharashtra “Varkaris” (predominantly simple farmers) is a big community. They usually undertake 21-day walk after they have completed the sowing process in their fields. In the Ashadi Ekadasi festival, people from every faith and religion participate. Learned sages also come for it. Jnyaneshwar preached the Gita which is considered the highest religious text in Maharashtra.

The 'Bhakti Marg' (the path of devotion) as propounded by Sant Jnyaneshwar, teach us to forget the physical self in pursuit of the Lord. When the Varkaris sing and dance during the pilgrimage, they forget the material world around them.

Along with the Dindi procession, seva to the poor and needy is done reflecting that Lord is in all forms. This is called ‘Seva Dindi’. During the Seva Dindi, the people on pilgrimage undertake selfless service to the poor and needy like Amrut Kalash (Annadhan), Narayan seva, Medical seva, Building & repairing rural infrastructure etc.

Participation in Ashadi Dindi and Seva Dindi helps an individual in many ways by bringing good health, peace & prosperity in his life. Chanting the continuous glory of the God in the Ashadi Dindi procession and Seva Dindi purifies an individual, there is an inner cleansing that takes place in Mind, Body and Spirit and the participants tend to lose their individual identities and experience bliss. It develops all aspects of human personality and helps us understand the true purpose of Life.

The Temple

The main entrance of Lord Vittala's Temple is facing towards the Chandrabhaga or Bhima river. Samadhi of Namadev and Chokamela is at the entrance. Pilgrims will first pray to the Devotees and then enter the temple. A small Ganesh Shrine is present inside the temple as first Shrine. Then, a small hall where bhajans are performed.

A small Shrine for Garuda and Hanuman. Then, after climbing a few steps, we can see the face of Lord Vittala. We can have this Mukha Darshan any time without standing in Queue.
For, Padha Darshan (To touch the Lotus Feet of Lord), there is an entrance which leads to the queue complex outside the temple. It will lead to many small shrines of Bhaktas, then towards the Lord Panduranga. We can touch the feet of Lord. We feel best when we touch the Lord's Lotus feet.
There are Shrines for Rukmini Devi, Satyabhama Devi, Radhika Devi (Rahi), Lord Narasimha, Lord Venkateshwara, Goddess Mahalakshmi, Nagaraj, Ganesha, Annapoorna Devi. There is another mandap where all devotees play like Krishna had played with Gopikas.
It is a great experience.

See also
Rukmini
Rahi (goddess)
Avatars of Vishnu
Chokhamela

References

External links
 Vithoba Temple's daily schedule
 Vithoba Temple Pandharpur - The Divine India

Hindu temples in Maharashtra
Warkari
Haridasa
Vishnu temples
Tourist attractions in Solapur district
Krishna temples